The Diapriidae are a family of parasitoid wasps. These tiny insects have an average length of 2–4 mm and never exceed 8 mm. They typically attack larvae and pupae of a wide range of insects, especially flies. The about 2,300 described species in around 200 described genera are divided into three subfamilies, and the group has a global distribution.

Diapriids show considerable diversity of form, with aptery (lack of wings) fairly common, sometimes in both sexes. Nearly all species exhibit noticeable sexual dimorphism, with males and females often mistaken for separate species. The wings, when present, show characteristically reduced venation, with the greatest reduction in the subfamilies Ambositrinae and Diapriinae.

Selected genera

Acanopsilus
Acanosema
Acanthopsilus
Aclista
Acropiesta
Anaclista
Aneurhynchus
Aneuropria
Anommatium
Antropria
Aprestes
Atomopria
Aulacopria
Auxopaedeutes
Basalys
Belyta
Bruesopria
Cardiopsilus
Cerapsilon
Cinetus
Coptera
Cordylocras
Cyathopria
Diapria
Diphora
Doliopria
Ecitovagus
Entomacis
Erasikea
Eumiota
Eunuchopria
Geodiapria
Gwaihiria
†Iberopria
Idiotypa
Labidopria
Labolips
Lepidopria
Lyteba
Macrohynnis
Maoripria
Miota
Monelata
Myrmecopria
Neurogalesus
Opazon
Oxylabis
Oxypria
Pamis
Panbelista
Pantoclis
Pantolyta
Paramesius
Paroxylabis
Pentapria
Plagiopria
Platymischus
Polypeza
Praeaclista
Propsilomma
Psilomma
Psilommacra
Psilus
Rhynchopsilus
Scorpioteleia
Solenopsia
Spilomicrus
Symphytopria
Synacra
Synbelyta
Tetramopria
Townesella
Trichopria
Valia
Viennopria
†Xenomorphia
Zygota

References

Diapriidae page on Tolweb
Family description
The Diapriidae
Family Diapriidae images at EOL
Flickr Tagged Images

Parasitica
Apocrita families